Davidson Academy is a private Christian school located in Nashville, Tennessee. It has students ranging from K-3 to 12th grade.

History
Davidson Academy, originally called Madison Christian School, enrolled students from grades one through four in 1980. The school expanded and was renamed after Davidson Academy.

Bill Chaney, the founding headmaster, retired in June 2015 after 35 years of service.  He was succeeded by Tim Johnson, who himself was succeeded by Joseph Bradley. Most recently in May 2021, Terri Simmons was named Interim Headmaster when Joseph Bradley vacated that position.

Academics
Davidson Academy requires students to complete a rigorous college preparatory program before graduation. The students attend a weekly chapel led by teachers, students, and guest speakers.

The Lower School, grades 1–6, offers TAP, Targeted Academic Progress, which is fast-paced learning for advanced students. The program allows children to reach their potential by providing targeted, personalized instruction in a group setting. Spanish, music, guidance, library and art classes are first introduced in K–3, and continue throughout elementary school. A fully operational science lab, computer lab, and gym are also used as learning tools. More extensive dance and music (piano, violin, voice) classes are offered after school hours.

The High School, grades 7–12, offers Advanced Placement classes, including Calculus AB and BC, English Literature and Composition, English Language and Composition, United States Government and Politics, United States History, AP Human Geography, Physics. An Honors program is offered for advanced students, requiring three years of a foreign language, all offered Honors classes, four AP classes in three different subjects, and a 25 or higher on the ACT.

Fine arts
Davidson Academy offers classes in band, chorus, theater, poetry, creative writing, visual arts, dance (ballet, tap, jazz), piano, and voice. The Davidson Academy band has received five first-place trophies, and invites exceptional students to join Tri-M, the music honor society. Three students in the class of 2011 received this honor. The Davidson Academy theater department teaches both introductory and advanced theater, inviting all willing students to participate in its plays. There are between three and four plays every year, including one musical. Currently, four students have been invited to participate in the Nashville Shakespeare Festival's Apprentice Company.

Athletics
Davidson Academy fields a full complement of varsity sports teams for both women and men. Davidson competes in Division 2, section A of the private school division, in the Tennessee Secondary School Athletic Association. Davidson Academy won two consecutive state titles in their division for football in the 2005 and 2006 football seasons. And also won the state championship in football in 2008 and most recently, back to back to back championships in 2018-20 with an undefeated season in 2018 and 2020. Additional recent state titles include 11 state championships for Women's Golf, a Baseball State Championship in 2003, and the Softball State Championships in 2002 and 2008.

Other teams in Davidson's classification are:
Donelson Christian Academy High School (Donelson, Tennessee)
Webb School of Knoxville
Bishop Byrne High School (Memphis, Tennessee)
First Assembly Christian School (Cordova)
The King's Academy (Seymour)
Lighthouse Christian (Millington)
Memphis Catholic High School (Memphis, Tennessee)
Tipton Rosemark Academy (Millington)
Rossville Christian
Northpoint Christian School (Southaven, Mississippi)
St. Andrew's-Sewanee School (Sewanee)
St. George's (Collierville)

Notable alumni
Rachel Smith, Miss USA, 2007 (4th Runnerup -Miss Universe, 2007)

Social views
In January 2015, Davidson Academy administrators cancelled a pre-K prospective student visit after learning that the child had two fathers. In the letter rejecting the child, Davidson Academy administrators stated that they "believe strongly in a strict interpretation of the Scriptures regarding the institution of marriage" and that they have "the right and responsibility to do everything possible to ensure that its expressed purposes, mission, and beliefs continue in their highest traditions and are not harmed, compromised, or hindered by unacceptable lifestyle conduct on the part of its students, parents or guardians."

References

Christian schools in Tennessee
Schools in Nashville, Tennessee
Private high schools in Tennessee